Alto de la Alianza District is one of ten districts of the province Tacna in Peru.

Authorities

Mayors 
 2011-2014: Willy Wilson Méndez Chávez. 
 2007-2010: Luis Alberto Mamani Churacutipa.

Festivities 
 May Krus 
 Our Lady of Copacabana

References